Pennies from Heaven may refer to:

Music
 "Pennies from Heaven" (song) (1936), a popular American song, originated by Bing Crosby
 Pennies from Heaven, the second disc of the Bing Crosby box set Bing's Hollywood (1962)
 "Pennies from Heaven" (Inner City song) (1992)

Film and TV
 Pennies from Heaven (1936 film), starring Bing Crosby and Madge Evans, and introducing the song
 Pennies from Heaven (1981 film), a musical starring Steve Martin and Bernadette Peters
 Pennies from Heaven (TV series) (1978), a BBC drama by Dennis Potter